San Joaquín is a city located in San Joaquín Municipality, Carabobo State, Venezuela. 

In 2001, the city's population was 47,920.

The town is well known for its local biscuits, the  "panelas of San Joaquín".

External links
Official website 

Cities in Carabobo